Adrian of Nicomedia (died 306), Herculian Guard of the Roman Emperor Galerius Maximian
Adrian of Canterbury (died 710), scholar and the Abbot of St Augustine's Abbey in Canterbury
Adrian of Corinth (died 251), early Christian saint and martyr 

Pope Adrian III (died 885)
Adrian of May (died 875), Scottish saint and martyr from the Isle of May, martyred by Vikings
Adrian of Poshekhon (died 1550), Russian Orthodox saint, hegumen of Dormition monastery in Yaroslavl region
Adrian of Monza, Russian Orthodox saint, see May 5 (Eastern Orthodox liturgics)
Adrian of Ondrusov (died 1547), Russian Orthodox saint and wonder-worker 

San Adrian (tunnel) and hermitage, a landmark in the Way of St. James